Heterodrilus is a genus of annelids belonging to the family Naididae.

The genus has cosmopolitan distribution.

Species:

Heterodrilus amplus 
Heterodrilus apparatus 
Heterodrilus arenicolus 
Heterodrilus ascensionensis 
Heterodrilus bulbiporus 
Heterodrilus carinatus 
Heterodrilus chenianus 
Heterodrilus claviatriatus 
Heterodrilus decipiens 
Heterodrilus densus 
Heterodrilus devexus 
Heterodrilus dolosus 
Heterodrilus eremita 
Heterodrilus ersei 
Heterodrilus flexuosus 
Heterodrilus hispidus 
Heterodrilus inermis 
Heterodrilus jamiesoni 
Heterodrilus keenani 
Heterodrilus lacertosus 
Heterodrilus maccaini 
Heterodrilus maiusculus 
Heterodrilus mediopapillosus 
Heterodrilus minisetosus 
Heterodrilus modestus 
Heterodrilus nudus 
Heterodrilus obliquus 
Heterodrilus occidentalis 
Heterodrilus paucifascis 
Heterodrilus pentcheffi 
Heterodrilus perkinsi 
Heterodrilus quadrithecatus 
Heterodrilus queenslandicus 
Heterodrilus rapidensis 
Heterodrilus rarus 
Heterodrilus salmonensis 
Heterodrilus scitus 
Heterodrilus subtilis 
Heterodrilus tripartitus 
Heterodrilus uniformis 
Heterodrilus ursulae 
Heterodrilus virilis

References

Naididae
Annelid genera